Barbara Schantz was a police officer in Springfield, Ohio when she appeared nude in the May 1982 issue of Playboy. Her pictorial was photographed by staff photographer Pompeo Posar.  She was born in Enon, Ohio.  Her story was made into the 1983 movie Policewoman Centerfold featuring Melody Anderson. Schantz still resides in Springfield and is retired from the police force.

See also
 Carol Shaya

References

Living people
American municipal police officers
Year of birth missing (living people)
People from Clark County, Ohio
People from Springfield, Ohio